The Best of Little Walter is the first LP record by American blues performer Little Walter. First released in 1958, the compilation album contains ten Little Walter songs that appeared in the Top 10 of the Billboard R&B chart from 1952 to 1955, plus two B-sides. The album was first released by Checker Records as LP-1428, which was the first LP record released by Checker, and then released on Chess Records with the same catalog number.

The album has been reissued numerous times, although it has been largely superseded by the twenty-song collection Little Walter His Best: Chess 50th Anniversary Collection.

Artwork and packaging 
The album cover features a black-and-white photo portrait shot by Grammy award winning photographer Don Bronstein of Little Walter holding/playing a Hohner 64 Chromatic harmonica and liner notes by Studs Terkel, who had written Giants of Jazz. The original LP featured a black label.

Accolades 
In 1991, The Best of Little Walter was inducted into the Blues Foundation Hall of Fame in the "Classics of Blues Recordings – Album" category.  The album is also ranked #198 in Rolling Stone magazine's list of the "500 Greatest Albums of All Time".

Track listing

Personnel 
The following people contributed to the Best of Little Walter:
Little Walter – lead vocals, harmonica
Muddy Waters – guitar on "Juke" and "Can't Hold Out Much Longer"
Jimmy Rogers – guitar on "Juke" and "Can't Hold Out Much Longer"
David Myers – guitar
Louis Myers – guitar
Leonard Caston – guitar on "My Babe"
Robert Lockwood Jr. – guitar on "My Babe"
Willie Dixon – bass, producer
Elgin Evans – drums on "Juke" and "Can't Hold Out Much Longer"
Fred Below – drums
Studs Terkel – sleeve notes

Singles chart 
The songs "Juke" and "My Babe" peaked at #1 on Billboard magazine's R&B Singles chart. "Sad Hours", "You're So Fine", and "Blues with a Feeling" made it to #2 on the same chart. "Last Night" and "Mean Old World" peaked at #6, "Off the Wall" and "You Better Watch Yourself" reached #8, and "Tell Me Mama" made it to #10.

Release history

References 

1958 greatest hits albums
Blues compilation albums
Checker Records compilation albums
Chess Records compilation albums
Little Walter albums
Albums produced by Willie Dixon
Albums produced by Leonard Chess
Albums produced by Phil Chess
MCA Records compilation albums